SB 242 is a bill which was proposed in the California Senate February 24, 2009, by Senator Leland Yee (D), as a modification of the Unruh Civil Rights Act in California.

It was approved (vote 3–2) by Committee in March, 2009.

It was approved (vote 21–15) by the Senate on April 16, 2009.

It was amended July 14, 2009.  The changes improve the clarity of the wording of the bill, but do not change the meaning of the bill.

It was approved (vote of 48–27) by the Assembly on August 20, 2009.

(As of 26 August 2009)
SB 242 must receive a procedural concurrence vote in the Senate before heading to the Governor's desk.

This bill was vetoed by the Governor on October 11, 2009.

Excerpts from the bill's text
Legislative Counsel's Digest (from the amended version)

The Unruh Civil Rights Act generally prohibits business
establishments from discriminating on the basis of sex, race, color,
religion, ancestry, national origin, disability, or medical
condition.
This bill would make it a violation of the Unruh Civil Rights Act
to adopt or enforce a policy that requires, limits,
business establishment, unless the policy is justified by a business necessity, as defined, and
notification has been provided of the circumstances and the time when
the language restriction  or requirement  is to be observed
and of the consequences for its violation.
The bill would define business necessity to require, among other things, that the language
restriction  or requirement  is necessary for the safe and efficient operation of the
business and that an equally effective, but less discriminatory,
alternative practice does not exist.

Controversy
It is of concern to many companies that this legislation will either open them to lawsuits, or increase their cost of doing business in California, as they could be subject to minimum damages of $4,000, if a business limits the use of a customer's language, even if unintentionally.

See also
 Politics of California
 Unruh Civil Rights Act

External links
Does the United States have an official national language?
James Crawford's Language Policy Web Site & Emporium
English language legislation gathers steam across the USA.

References

Proposed laws of California
2009 in California